Macrobrachium nipponense is a species of freshwater shrimp found in Asia that was first described in 1849. ''

References

Palaemonidae
Freshwater crustaceans of Asia
Crustaceans described in 1849